Makalom is a small uninhabited island in the Reef Islands, in the Solomon Islands province of Temotu. The island is 350 m long and 60 m wide, and is located on the south-west side of an oval-shaped atoll 2.5 km long and 1.5 km wide, some 4.8 km WNW of Pileni Island.

See also

 Desert island
 List of islands

References

External links
 Makalom on Solomonislands.com.sb

Uninhabited islands of the Solomon Islands